The 1998 NCAA Division I men's ice hockey tournament involved 12 schools playing in single-elimination play to determine the national champion of men's NCAA Division I college ice hockey. It began on March 27, 1998, and ended with the championship game on April 4. A total of 11 games were played.

Qualifying teams
The at-large bids and seeding for each team in the tournament were announced after the conference tournaments concluded.  The Central Collegiate Hockey Association (CCHA), the ECAC, Hockey East and Western Collegiate Hockey Association (WCHA) all received 3 berths in the tournament.

Game locations
 East Regional – Pepsi Arena, Albany, New York
 West Regional – Yost Ice Arena, Ann Arbor, Michigan
 Frozen Four – Fleet Center, Boston

Brackets

Regionals

Frozen Four

Note: * denotes overtime period(s)

Regional Quarterfinals

East Regional

(3) Clarkson vs. (6) Colorado College

(4) Wisconsin vs. (5) New Hampshire

West Regional

(3) Michigan vs. (6) Princeton

(4) Ohio State vs. (5) Yale

Regional semifinals

East Regional

(1) Boston University vs. (5) New Hampshire

(2) Boston College vs. (6) Colorado College

West Regional

(1) Michigan State vs. (4) Ohio State

(2) North Dakota vs. (3) Michigan

Frozen Four

National semifinal

(E5) New Hampshire vs. (W3) Michigan

(E2) Boston College vs. (W4) Ohio State

National Championship

(W3) Michigan vs. (E2) Boston College

All-Tournament team
G: Marty Turco* (Michigan)
D: Bubba Berenzweig (Michigan)
D: Mike Mottau (Boston College)
F: Mark Kosick (Michigan)
F: Josh Langfeld (Michigan)
F: Marty Reasoner (Boston College)
* Most Outstanding Player(s)

Record by conference

References

Tournament
NCAA Division I men's ice hockey tournament
NCAA Men's Division Ice Hockey Tournament
NCAA Men's Division Ice Hockey Tournament
NCAA Men's Division Ice Hockey Tournament
NCAA Men's Division Ice Hockey Tournament
NCAA Men's Division Ice Hockey Tournament
NCAA Men's Division Ice Hockey Tournament
Ice hockey competitions in Albany, New York
Ice hockey competitions in Boston
Ice hockey competitions in Michigan
Sports in Ann Arbor, Michigan